Kfar Zeitim (lit. Village of Olives) is a moshav in northern Israel. Located adjacent to Tiberias, it falls under the jurisdiction of Lower Galilee Regional Council.

History
The village was established in 1950 by Jewish immigrants from Yemen on the land of the depopulated Arab village of Hittin. The name of the village refers to the many olive groves in the area. Although some of the founders left the village later, over the years immigrants from Kurdistan have settled in the village.

Education
The village is home to The Kfar Zeitim Yeshiva, a Vocational High School and Youth Village for Ultra-Orthodox (Chareidi) Jewish boys with learning difficulties, Attention deficit hyperactivity disorder (ADHD) and similar conditions. The yeshiva combines study of Talmud and other Jewish texts with vocational training in Computers, Carpentry, Electricity and Agriculture and Animal husbandry. Rabbinic staff and a social worker tend to the emotional and spiritual needs of the students. The Yeshiva offers high levels of personal counseling and support from professionals including an educational psychologist, and a program of regular hikes and activities in the surrounding region.

References

Kurdish-Jewish culture in Israel
Moshavim
Populated places in Northern District (Israel)
Populated places established in 1950
1950 establishments in Israel
Yemeni-Jewish culture in Israel